Plectrocnemia variegata is a species of tube maker caddisfly in the family Polycentropodidae, first described by Nathan Banks in 1900. It is found in North America.

References

Trichoptera
Articles created by Qbugbot
Insects described in 1900